John W. Cebrowski (born October 15, 1939) is an American politician from the state of New Hampshire. A Republican, he served in the New Hampshire House of Representatives, representing Hillsborough's 7th district until 2014.

Cebrowski graduated from the Rochester Institute of Technology, Rhode Island School of Design, and Northwestern University's Kellogg School of Management. He served in the United States Marine Corps from 1962 through 1967, and was deployed during the Vietnam War. He worked as a marketing and sales executive for General Electric, Xerox, and U.S. Surgical.

References

External links

 

1939 births
Living people
United States Marine Corps personnel of the Vietnam War
Republican Party members of the New Hampshire House of Representatives
Rochester Institute of Technology alumni
Rhode Island School of Design alumni
Kellogg School of Management alumni
United States Marines
American marketing businesspeople
Place of birth missing (living people)
21st-century American politicians